Ian Sydney Gordon (born 2 April 1950) is a Canadian sprinter. He competed in the men's 4 × 400 metres relay at the 1972 Summer Olympics.

References

1950 births
Living people
Athletes (track and field) at the 1970 British Commonwealth Games
Athletes (track and field) at the 1971 Pan American Games
Athletes (track and field) at the 1972 Summer Olympics
Canadian male sprinters
Olympic track and field athletes of Canada
Athletes from Vancouver
Commonwealth Games competitors for Canada
Pan American Games track and field athletes for Canada